Al-Husayniyya  was a Palestinian village, depopulated in 1948.

On 13 May 1948, Haganah paramilitary forces committed a crime by killing more than 30 children and women, which led the rest of the people living in the village to flee and seek shelter in Lebanon and Syria.

Location
The village was located 11 kilometres northeast of Safed, on a slightly  elevated hill in the southwestern corner of the al-Hula Plain.  It stood along the eastern side of a highway that led to Safad and Tiberias.

History
The Arab geographer Yaqut al-Hamawi noted its ancient buildings and praised one of them, which he claimed had originally been a temple and perhaps was built by Solomon.

Ottoman era
In 1881, the PEF's Survey of Western Palestine (SWP)  described the place as having "a few ruined cattle-sheds".

In the second half of the 19th century, after the Algerian followers of Abdelkader El Djezairi had been defeated by the French in Algeria, they sought refuge in another part of the Ottoman Empire. They were given lands in various locations in Ottoman Syria, including al-Husayniyya, and the nearby villages of Dayshum, Ammuqa, Marus and Tulayl.

British Mandate era
In the 1922 census of Palestine, conducted by the British Mandate authorities, the  Husainiyeh tribal area  had a population of 127; all Muslims, increasing to 274 in the  1931 census;  still all Muslims,  in  a total of 64  houses.

In the 1945 statistics the population the combined population of  Tulayl and Al-Husayniyya was 340 Muslims, with a total of 5,324 dunams of land, according to an official land and population survey. All the villagers were Muslims. A total of 3,388 dunums was allocated to cereals and 22 dunums were irrigated or used for orchards for Tuleil and Al-Husayniyya. The villagers also kept livestock, especially water buffalo, for ploughing, dairy production, and meat.

1948, and aftermath
On the night of 12–13 March 1948, a Palmah strike against Husseiniyya resulted in a number of houses being  blown up,  and several dozen Arabs, who included members of an Iraqi volunteer contingent and women and children, were killed and another 20 wounded. According to reports, Husseiniyya's mukhtar was executed after being reassured by the raiders that he would not be harmed. The Palmah's Third Battalion lost three dead. According to Palmah reports cited  by Morris, "the village was completely evacuated".  Some of the villagers who escaped the massacres may have remained or returned in subsequent days; according to Israeli military intelligence, the residents of al-Husayniyya did not leave until 21 April.

The Palestinian historian Walid Khalidi described the place in 1992: "Only piles of stone and sections of walls from demolished houses remain. The site itself is overgrown with thorns, grasses, and scattered Christ’s-thorn trees, and is used as pasture. The land in the vicinity is cultivated."

See also
Depopulated Palestinian locations in Israel
Killings and massacres during the 1948 Palestine War

References

Bibliography

External links
Welcome To al-Husayniyya, Palestine Remembered
al-Husayniyya, Zochrot
Survey of Western Palestine, Map 4: IAA, Wikimedia commons
 al-Husayniyya, Villages of Palestine

Arab villages depopulated during the 1948 Arab–Israeli War
District of Safad